The 34th Cannes Film Festival was held from 13 to 27 May 1981. The Palme d'Or went to the Człowiek z żelaza by Andrzej Wajda. The festival opened with Three Brothers (Tre fratelli) by Francesco Rosi and closed with Honeysuckle Rose, directed by Jerry Schatzberg.

Jury 
The following people were appointed as the Jury of the 1981 feature film competition:

Feature films
Jacques Deray (France) Jury President
Ellen Burstyn (USA)
Jean-Claude Carrière (France)
Robert Chazal (France)
Attilio d'Onofrio (Italy)
Christian Defaye (Switzerland) (journalist)
Carlos Diegues (Brazil)
Antonio Gala (Spain)
Andrey Petrov (Soviet Union)
Douglas Slocombe (UK)

Official selection

In competition - Feature film
The following feature films competed for the Palme d'Or:

Angels of Iron by Thomas Brasch
Beau-père by Bertrand Blier
Chariots of Fire by Hugh Hudson
Cserepek by István Gaál
Excalibur by John Boorman
Faktas by Almantas Grikevičius
Flame Top by Pirjo Honkasalo, Pekka Lehto
Heaven's Gate by Michael Cimino
Light Years Away by Alain Tanner
Looks and Smiles by Ken Loach
Man of Iron by Andrzej Wajda
Mephisto by István Szabó
Montenegro by Dušan Makavejev
National Heritage by Luis García Berlanga
Neige by Juliet Berto
Passion of Love by Ettore Scola
Possession by Andrzej Żuławski
Quartet by James Ivory
The Skin by Liliana Cavani
Thief by Michael Mann
Tragedy of a Ridiculous Man by Bernardo Bertolucci
Les Uns et les Autres by Claude Lelouch

Un Certain Regard
The following films were selected for the competition of Un Certain Regard:

...And God Created Them by Jacobo Morales
Arising from the Surface by Mani Kaul
The Big Night Bathe by Binka Zhelyazkova
Cerromaior by Luís Filipe Rocha
Eijanaika by Shohei Imamura
I Love You by Arnaldo Jabor
Let There Be Light by John Huston
Memoirs of a Survivor by David Gladwell
Un moment de bonheur by Yves Laumet
Mur Murs by Agnès Varda
A Thousand Little Kisses by Mira Recanati
The Witness by Péter Bacsó
Who's That Singing Over There by Slobodan Šijan
You Love Only Once by Rajko Grlić

Films out of competition
The following films were selected to be screened out of competition:

Anima – Symphonie phantastique by Titus Leber
Blood Wedding by Carlos Saura
From Mao to Mozart: Isaac Stern in China by Murray Lerner
Hands Up! by Jerzy Skolimowski
Havoc in Heaven by Wan Laiming
Honeysuckle Rose by Jerry Schatzberg
La Mouche by Ferenc Rofusz
The Postman Always Rings Twice by Bob Rafelson
Street Angel by Mu-jih Yuan
This Is Elvis by Malcolm Leo, Andrew Solt
Three Brothers by Francesco Rosi
Troubled Laughter by Yimin Deng, Yanjin Yang

Short film competition
The following short films competed for the Short Film Palme d'Or:

Alephah by Gérald Frydman
André Derain, thèmes et variations by François Porcile
Dilemma by John Halas
Diskzokej by Jiří Barta
Král a skritek by Lubomír Beneš
Manövergäste by G. Nicolas Hayek
Maskirani razbojnik by Petar Lalovic
Moto Perpetuo by Béla Vajda
Ne me parlez plus jamais d'amour by Sylvain Madigan
Le Rat by Elisabeth Huppert
Ravnovesie by Boiko Kanev
Trcanje by Dusko Sevo
Zea by André Leduc

Parallel sections

International Critics' Week
The following feature films were screened for the 20th International Critics' Week (20e Semaine de la Critique):

She Dances Alone by Robert Dornhelm
The Moth by Tomasz Zygadlo
Fil, fond, fosfor by Philippe Nahoun
Kill Hitler by Villi Hermann, Niklaus Meienberg, Hans Stürm
 by Jeanine Meerapfel
Fertile Memory by Michel Khleifi
Le Chapeau malheureux by Maria Sos

Directors' Fortnight
The following films were screened for the 1981 Directors' Fortnight (Quinzaine des Réalizateurs):

Albert Pinto Ko Gussa Kyoon Aata Hai by Saeed Akhtar Mirza
Alligator Shoes by Clay Borris
Americana by David Carradine
Act of Violence by Eduardo Escorel
Beddegama by Lester James Peries
Bolivar, Sinfonia Tropical by Diego Rísquez
Bona by Lino Brocka
Chakra, Vicious Circle by Rabindra Dharmaraj
Conversa Acabada by João Botelho
Desperado City by Vadim Glowna
No Mercy, No Future by Helma Sanders-Brahms
Francisca by Manoel De Oliveira
The Vulture by Yaky Yosha
The Mark of the Beast by Pieter Verhoeff
In Defense of People by Rafigh Pooya
Fruits of Passion by Shuji Terayama
The Plouffe Family by Gilles Carle
Memorias Do Medo by Alberto Graça
Narcissus and Psyche by Gábor Bódy
Seuls by Francis Reusser
Tell Me A Riddle by Lee Grant
Wizja lokalna 1901 by Filip Bajon

Short films

 Evolution by Sheila Graber
 Face To Face by Sheila Graber
 Le Miroir Vivant by Eunice Hutchins, Norbert Barnich
 Michelangelo by Sheila Graber
 Music For Film by Jean-Claude Wouters
 Pour Trois Minutes De Gloire by Jean-Claude Bronckart
 T.V.O. by Carlos Castillo
 The Electric Disco Chicken by Bob Goodness
 Tous Les Garcons by Yves Laberge
 Tre Per Eccesso by Giampierro Vinciguerra
 Uno Para Todos, Todos Para Todos by Carlos Castillo

Awards

Official awards
The following films and people received the 1981 awards:
Palme d'Or: Człowiek z żelaza by Andrzej Wajda
Grand Prix: Les Années lumière by Alain Tanner
Best Screenplay: István Szabó for Mephisto
Best Actress: Isabelle Adjani for Quartet and Possession
Best Actor: Ugo Tognazzi for La tragedia di un uomo ridicolo
Best Supporting Actress: Yelena Solovey for Faktas
Best Supporting Actor: Ian Holm for Chariots of Fire
Best Artistic Contribution: Excalibur by John Boorman
Golden Camera
Caméra d'Or: Desperado City by Vadim Glowna
Short films
Short Film Palme d'Or: Moto Perpetuo by Béla Vajda
Jury Prize: Le Rat by Elisabeth Huppert & Zea by André Leduc

Independent awards
FIPRESCI Prizes
 by Jeanine Meerapfel (International Critics' Week)
Mephisto by István Szabó (In competition)
Commission Supérieure Technique
 Technical Grand Prize: Les Uns et les Autres for the sound quality
Ecumenical Jury
 Prize of the Ecumenical Jury: Man of Iron (Człowiek z żelaza) by Andrzej Wajda
 Ecumenical Jury - Special Mention: Chariots of Fire by Hugh Hudson & Looks and Smiles by Ken Loach
Young Cinema Award
Looks and Smiles by Ken Loach
Neige by Juliet Berto and Jean-Henri Roger

References

Media
 INA: The parallel festival, Cannes 1981 (commentary in French)
 INA: Threat of suicide Italian-style for Ugo Tognazzi (in French)

External links 
1981 Cannes Film Festival (web.archive)
Official website Retrospective 1981 
Cannes Film Festival:1981 at Internet Movie Database

Cannes Film Festival
Cannes Film Festival
Cannes Film Festival
Cannes